Sidalcea glaucescens is a species of flowering plant in the mallow family known by the common name waxy checkerbloom.

Distribution
It is native to California, where it grows in the southernmost mountains of the Cascade Range and the Sierra Nevada, its distribution extending just over the border into Nevada. It can be found in mountain meadow habitats of yellow pine forest, red fir forest, lodgepole forest, and subalpine forest.

Description
The leaves are deeply divided into about five lobes which may be forked or edged with smaller lobes.

The inflorescence is a loose panicle of several flowers with pink or purplish petals 1 to 2 centimeters long. The bloom period is June to August.

References

External links
 Calflora Database:  Sidalcea glaucescens (Glaucous checker mallow,  Waxy checkerbloom, Waxy checkermallow)
Jepson Manual eFlora (TJM2) treatment of  Sidalcea glaucescens
USDA Plants Profile for Sidalcea glaucescens

glaucescens
Flora of California
Flora of Nevada
Flora of the Sierra Nevada (United States)
Flora of the Cascade Range
Flora without expected TNC conservation status